Syed Abu Dojana is an Indian politician belonging to Rashtriya Janata Dal. He was elected as a member of Bihar Legislative Assembly from Sursand in 2015.

References

Living people
Rashtriya Janata Dal politicians
Year of birth missing (living people)
Bihar MLAs 2015–2020